Reseda lutea, the yellow mignonette or wild mignonette, is a species of fragrant herbaceous plant. Its leaves and flowers have been used to make a yellow dye called "weld" since the first millennium BC, although the related plant Reseda luteola was more widely used for that purpose.

A native of Eurasia and North Africa, the plant is present on other continents as an introduced species and a common weed. In Australia it is a noxious weed and pest of agricultural crops.

References

External links

Jepson Manual Treatment
Photo gallery

lutea
Flora of Europe
Flora of the Canary Islands
Flora of North Africa
Flora of temperate Asia
Plants described in 1753
Taxa named by Carl Linnaeus